Pollex jurivetei is a moth of the family Erebidae first described by Michael Fibiger in 2007. It is known from Indonesia's western Seram Island.

The wingspan is 9–10 mm. The forewing is narrow and brown, with a black-brown costa in the medial area. The hindwing is unicolorous brown with an indistinct black discal spot and the underside unicolorous brown.

References

Micronoctuini
Taxa named by Michael Fibiger
Moths described in 2007